De Librije is a restaurant in Zwolle, Netherlands. It is a fine dining restaurant that has been awarded one or more Michelin stars since 1993. It carried one star in the period 1993–1998, two stars in the period 1999-2003 and three stars since 2004. In 2007 and 2008, the restaurant received a score of 19.5 and became Restaurant of the Year in the Dutch edition of Gault Millau.

The restaurant was formerly located in the old library of a 15th-century Dominican abbey, hence the name "De Librije". In 2015, the establishment moved to replace its secondary location on the other side of the Thorbeckegracht which housed the "Librije's Zusje" (Librijes little sister) as part of the "Librije's Hotel". The chef de cuisine is Jonnie Boer and his wife Thérèse Boer-Tausch is maître and sommelier. The couple, who both already worked in the restaurant, bought the establishment in 1992.

Awards
 Michelin star – one or more from 1993 to present
 The World's 50 Best Restaurant Awards – place 37 in 2010, 46 in 2011, 29 in 2014, 38 in 2016
 Gault Millau – Restaurant of the year 2011
 Verybest.com Awards – Very Best Restaurant 2010

See also
 List of Michelin starred restaurants in the Netherlands
 List of Michelin three starred restaurants

References

External links

Restaurants in the Netherlands
Michelin Guide starred restaurants in the Netherlands
De Librije